This article is a catalog of actresses and models who have appeared on the cover of Harper's Bazaar Indonesia, the Indonesian edition of Harper's Bazaar magazine.

2010

2011

2012

2013

2014

2015

2016

2017

2018

2019

2020

2021

2022

External links
 Harper's Bazaar Indonesia
 Harper's Bazaar Indonesia on Models.com

Indonesia